is a town located in Yamagata Prefecture, Japan. ,  the town had an estimated population of 14,174 in 4839 households, and a population density of 230 persons per km2.

Geography
Yamanobe is located in the southeast end of the Yamagata Basin in central Yamagata Prefecture, surrounded by mountains. Mount Shirataka is partially within the borders of the town.

Neighboring municipalities
Yamagata Prefecture
Yamagata
Ōe
Asahi
Nakayama
Shirataka
Nan'yō

Climate
Yamanobe has a Humid continental climate (Köppen climate classification Cfa) with large seasonal temperature differences, with warm to hot (and often humid) summers and cold (sometimes severely cold) winters. Precipitation is significant throughout the year, but is heaviest from August to October. The average annual temperature in Yamanobe is 10.1 °C. The average annual rainfall is 1546 mm with September as the wettest month. The temperatures are highest on average in August, at around 23.9 °C, and lowest in January, at around -2.6 °C.

Demographics
Per Japanese census data, the population of Yamanobe peaked around the year 2000 and has declined since.

History
The area of present-day Yamanobe was part of ancient Dewa Province. After the start of the Meiji period, the area became part of Higashimurayama District, Yamagata Prefecture. The village of Yamanobe was established on April 1, 1889 with the creation of the modern municipalities system. It was elevated to town status in 1896.

Economy
The economy of Yamanobe is based on agriculture.

Education
Yamanobe has three public elementary schools and two public middle schools operated by the town government, and one public high school operated by the Yamagata Prefectural Board of Education.

Transportation

Railway
 East Japan Railway Company - Aterazawa Line

Highway
  Tōhoku Chūō Expressway: Yamagata Chūō interchange

Local attractions
site of Yamanobe Castle

Noted People from Yamanobe
Mineichirō Adachi, diplomat, legal scholar

References

External links

Official Website 

 
Towns in Yamagata Prefecture